The Turkish Under 20 and Under 21 national basketball team, is the representative for Turkey in international basketball competitions, and it is organized and run by the Turkish Basketball Federation. The Turkish Under 20 Women national basketball team represents Turkey at the FIBA Europe Under-20 Championship for Women and the Turkish Under 21 Women national basketball team at the FIBA Under-21 World Championship for Women.

Current roster
Squad for the 2014 FIBA Europe Under-20 Championship for Women.

FIBA Europe Under-20 Championship for Women

Squads
2012 FIBA Europe Under-20 Championship for Women — Bronze Medal
Gizem Sezer, Ayşegül Günay, Özge Kavurmacıoğlu, Pelin Bilgiç, Ayşe Cora, Büşra Akgün, Cansu Köksal, Elif Emirtekin, Emel Güler, Merve Aydın, Gizem Başaran and Olcay Çakır. Head coach:  Aziz Akkaya.
2013 FIBA Europe Under-20 Championship for Women — Bronze Medal
Olcay Çakır, Merve Aydın, Büşra Akgün, Cansu Köksal, Ayşe Cora, Pelin Bilgiç, Didem Nakas, Özge Kavurmacıoğlu, Elif Emirtekin, Melike Yalçınkaya, Tilbe Şenyürek and Gizem Sezer. Head coach:  Aziz Akkaya.

FIBA Under-21 World Championship for Women

See also
 Men's
 Turkey Men's national basketball team
Turkey Men's national basketball team U20
Turkey Men's national basketball team U18 and U19
Turkey Men's national basketball team U16 and U17
Turkey Men's national 3x3 team
 Women's
Turkey Women's national basketball team
Turkey Women's national basketball team U20
Turkey Women's national basketball team U18 and U19
Turkey Women's national basketball team U16 and U17
Turkey Women's national 3x3 team

References

U
Women's U20
Women's national under-20 basketball teams